Charles Dodge may refer to:

 Charles C. Dodge (1841–1910), Brigadier General during the American Civil War at the age of twenty-one
 Charles Dodge (composer) (born 1942), composer of electronic music